Green Ghost is a boardgame.

Green ghost or Green Ghost may also refer to:

 A ghost that is green
 Slimer from Ghostbusters, marketed as The Green Ghost
 A short-lived name of the wrestler Crash Holly
 An alternative title of the film The Unholy Night
 A character created by Johnston McCulley
 An alternative name for the Ghost in Nedor Comics

See also
 The Green Ghost Project, a 2010 album by Style P and DJ Green Lantern
 No. 93 Squadron RAAF, nicknamed Green Ghost Squadron